Horace Maynard (August 30, 1814 – May 3, 1882) was an American educator, attorney, politician and diplomat active primarily in the second half of the 19th century.  Initially elected to the House of Representatives from Tennessee's 2nd Congressional District for the term commencing on March 4, 1857, Maynard, an ardent Union supporter and abolitionist, became one of the few Southern congressmen to maintain his seat in the House during the Civil War.  Toward the end of the war, Maynard served as Tennessee's attorney general under Governor Andrew Johnson, and later served as ambassador to the Ottoman Empire under President Ulysses S. Grant and Postmaster General under President Rutherford B. Hayes.

Maynard left his teaching position at East Tennessee College in the early 1840s to pursue a career in law, and quickly developed a reputation among his peers for his reasoning ability and biting sarcastic style.  He spent much of his first two terms in Congress fighting to preserve the Union, and during the Civil War, he consistently urged President Abraham Lincoln to send Union forces to free East Tennessee from its Confederate occupiers.  Maynard returned to Congress after the war, but being a Republican in a Democrat-controlled state, he struggled in statewide elections.

Biography

Early life
Born in Westborough, Massachusetts, Maynard was educated at Millbury Academy and later at Amherst College.  When Maynard entered Amherst, he puzzled his classmates by placing a "V" above his door, the meaning of which was revealed in 1838 when Maynard was named valedictorian of his graduating class.  In 1839, he moved to Knoxville, Tennessee, where he accepted a position as a professor at East Tennessee College (now the University of Tennessee).  He initially taught in the university's preparatory (high school) department, but in 1841 he became a college-level teacher of mathematics and ancient languages.

Maynard was initially disenchanted with Knoxville, which he considered backward and unsophisticated, and contemplated leaving Tennessee.  After he was admitted to the bar in 1844, however, he found a niche arguing cases in local courts, and decided to make the city his permanent home.  Knoxville attorney Oliver Perry Temple (1820–1907), a colleague of Maynard, described Maynard as "abrupt and unamiable, and often offensive in his manners, snapping up men without hesitation."  This style agitated Maynard's peers, but at the same time gained their respect.

Early congressional terms

When Maynard first ran for Congress in 1852, he was ruthlessly attacked in local newspapers, and was defeated by William Churchwell.  In 1856, with the Knoxville Whig backing his campaign, he captured the 2nd District's congressional seat.  In his 1858 reelection campaign, Maynard easily defeated fellow attorney J. C. Ramsey, winning 67% of the vote.

Maynard initially supported the Whig Party, and served as a presidential elector in 1852.  After the collapse of the Whig Party, he ran for Congress on the American, Opposition and Unionist party tickets for congressional terms beginning in 1857, 1859, and 1861, respectively.

Secession crisis and views on slavery

Maynard's complex views on slavery reflected shifting sentiments that were common among East Tennessee Unionists.  During the 1830s, Maynard, the son of an abolitionist, found slavery contemptible, calling it "a curse to the country."  By 1850, however, Maynard was defending the practice of slavery in letters to his father, arguing there was a "bright as well as a dark side to slavery."  In 1860, Maynard had previously owned four slaves, and while he opposed secession as a congressman, he nevertheless defended slavery.  Near the end of the Civil War, Maynard shifted once again to an abolitionist viewpoint on slavery, and supported Lincoln's Emancipation Proclamation.

Along with fellow Unionists Andrew Johnson, T. A. R. Nelson, and William G. Brownlow, Maynard worked feverishly to keep Tennessee in the Union amidst the secession crisis of 1860 and 1861.  In the weeks leading up to the state's June 8 referendum on secession, Maynard travelled across East Tennessee, giving dozens of pro-Union speeches.  Maynard was also a member of the Knox County delegation to the pro-Union East Tennessee Convention, which sought to create a separate Union-aligned state in East Tennessee.

Civil War

After the East Tennessee Union Convention adjourned in June 1861, Maynard headed for Washington, D.C. to take his seat in Congress.  When Confederate forces occupied East Tennessee later that year, Maynard consistently pleaded with Lincoln to send troops to free the region, warning that East Tennesseans' "tears and blood will be a blot on your administration that time can never efface."  In December 1861, Maynard blasted General George H. Thomas for balking at an invasion of the region in the wake of so-called bridge-burning conspiracy, calling his efforts "disgraceful."  Later that month, General George B. McClellan wrote to General Don Carlos Buell:

Johnson, Maynard, etc., are again becoming frantic, and have President Lincoln's sympathy excited.  Political considerations would make it advisable to get the arms and troops into Eastern Tennessee at a very early day ...

In spite of Maynard's efforts, Union troops did not enter Knoxville until September 1863.  By the time Maynard returned to the city, a rift had developed among East Tennessee's Unionists between those who supported the Emancipation Proclamation (led by Maynard and Brownlow) and those who simply sought a return to the pre-war status quo (led by Nelson and Knoxville mayor James C. Luttrell).  In 1864, Maynard was appointed Tennessee's attorney general by Andrew Johnson, who had been installed as the state's military governor.

Postwar activities

Maynard attended the National Union Convention in 1866 and was elected to the 39th Congress as an Unconditional Unionist the same year following the readmission of Tennessee into the Union. He then served in the 40th, 41st, 42nd and 43rd Congresses as a Republican. During the 43rd Congress he acted as chairman of the U.S. House Committee on Banking and Currency. In 1868, while serving in Congress, Maynard was appointed to the Tennessee Supreme Court by Governor Brownlow to fill the vacancy created by the resignation of Samuel Milligan. Maynard held both offices simultaneously, but his right to do so was challenged in Calloway v. Strum, 48 Tennessee (1 Heiskell), 764. The court in that case held that Maynard's judicial acts were valid based on the presumption that his acceptance of the Supreme Court appointment constituted a resignation of his congressional office, and that it was up to Congress to address his continued occupation of that office. Maynard's name was on the ballot to be nominated for Vice President in the 1872 National Union Republican Convention held in Philadelphia on June 5 and 6. Maynard lost and only received 26 total votes. All 24 from Tennessee, and 1 each from Alabama and Mississippi.

Maynard reached the height of his political career in 1873 when he defeated both former President Andrew Johnson and popular West Tennessee politician Benjamin F. Cheatham in the race for Tennessee's at-large congressional district.  The following year, he ran for Governor of Tennessee as a Republican, but lost to James D. Porter. He was appointed Minister to Turkey and served from 1875 to 1880 in that post. He was appointed United States Postmaster General in the Cabinet of President Rutherford B. Hayes and served from June 2, 1880 to March 5, 1881.

Maynard died suddenly from heart disease in Knoxville in 1882, and was buried in Knoxville's Old Gray Cemetery.

Legacy

Maynard was remembered among his peers for his powerful intellect and sense of persuasiveness. Knoxville Journal editor William Rule wrote that Maynard was the "best read man" of East Tennessee's lawyers, while abolitionist Frederick Douglass once remarked that Maynard had a "three story head." Knoxville mayor Peter Staub (a Democrat) said that even though he disliked Maynard, he was so impressed with Maynard's reasoning and rhetoric that he voted for him twice. Oliver Perry Temple wrote of Maynard: "Many were the persons he stung and wounded by his biting sarcasm or pungent wit." Humorist George Washington Harris mocked Maynard ("Stilyards") in his story, "The Widow McCloud's Mare."

During the 1850s, Knox County attempted to sue the newly formed Union County, Tennessee, out of existence. Maynard successfully represented Union County, and in return, the county named its county seat, Maynardville, in his honor. Horace Maynard High School served the county from 1923 until 1997, when it became a middle school. During the Spanish–American War, the USS Nashville, commanded by Maynard's son, Washburn, fired the war's first American shot.  Another son, James, was president of the Knoxville-based Brookside Mills in the early 1900s.

References and notes

External links

Finding Aid for the Horace Maynard Papers — University of Tennessee Special Collections
 

|-

|-

|-

|-

|-

1814 births
1882 deaths
People from Westborough, Massachusetts
United States Postmasters General
Hayes administration cabinet members
Tennessee Whigs
Tennessee Know Nothings
Know-Nothing members of the United States House of Representatives from Tennessee
Opposition Party members of the United States House of Representatives from Tennessee
Tennessee Oppositionists
Tennessee Unionists
Unionist Party members of the United States House of Representatives from Tennessee
Unconditional Union Party members of the United States House of Representatives from Tennessee
Republican Party members of the United States House of Representatives from Tennessee
1852 United States presidential electors
Ambassadors of the United States to the Ottoman Empire
Tennessee Attorneys General
Tennessee lawyers
People of Tennessee in the American Civil War
Politicians from Knoxville, Tennessee
Southern Unionists in the American Civil War
19th-century American diplomats
Amherst College alumni
University of Tennessee faculty
19th-century American politicians